The men's 20 kilometres walk event at the 2007 Summer Universiade was held on 14 August.

Results

References
Results

20
2007